Northern West Riding of Yorkshire was a parliamentary constituency covering part of the historic West Riding of Yorkshire.  It returned two Members of Parliament (MPs) to the House of Commons of the Parliament of the United Kingdom, elected by the bloc vote system.

History 

The constituency was created when the two-member West Riding of Yorkshire constituency was divided for the 1865 general election into two new constituencies, each returning two members: Northern West Riding of Yorkshire and Southern West Riding of Yorkshire. The extra seats were taken from parliamentary boroughs which had been disenfranchised for corruption.

In the redistribution which took effect for the 1868 general election the two divisions were redistributed into three. Eastern West Riding of Yorkshire was created and the Northern and Southern divisions modified. Each of the three divisions returned two members.

All three were abolished by the Redistribution of Seats Act 1885 for the 1885 general election.  The Northern division was replaced by five new single-member constituencies: Elland, Keighley, Shipley, Skipton and Sowerby.

Boundaries
The place of election was initially at Leeds (1861 Act), later at Bradford (1868 Act).

From 1865 to 1868 the constituency comprised the north half of the West Riding of Yorkshire. The Birkenhead Enfranchisement Act 1861 provided that it was to contain the wapentakes of Staincliffe and Ewecross, Claro, Skyrack, and Morley.

The Reform Act 1867 re-defined the constituency as the wapentake of Staincliffe and Ewcross, Claro, Skyrack, Barkston Ash, and Osgoldcross.
  
The Boundary Act 1868 again re-defined the constituency as the wapentake of Staincliffe and Ewcross with part of the wapentake of Morley (the parishes of Bradford and Halifax and the townships of Boston and Idle).

Members of Parliament

Election results

Elections in the 1860s

Elections in the 1870s
Crossley's death caused a by-election.

 

Cavendish was appointed a Lord Commissioner of the Treasury, requiring a by-election.

Elections in the 1880s

 

Cavendish was appointed Chief Secretary to the Lord Lieutenant of Ireland, causing a by-election. However, on 6 May 1882, just hours after taking the oath for the position, Cavendish was assassinated in Dublin in the Phoenix Park Murders.

References

Parliamentary constituencies in Yorkshire and the Humber (historic)
Constituencies of the Parliament of the United Kingdom established in 1865
Constituencies of the Parliament of the United Kingdom disestablished in 1885
North